Joni Ensio Kauko (born 12 July 1990) is a Finnish professional footballer who plays as a midfielder for Indian Super League club ATK Mohun Bagan and the Finland national team. Kauko was born in Turku, Finland where he played for the local youth teams before starting his senior career in Inter Turku at age 17 in 2008.

Kauko made his international debut for Finland in January 2012, at the age of 21. He was a regular member of the team that won League C group 2 in 2018–19 UEFA Nations League.

Club career

A product of local Inter Turku's youth system, Kauko signed his professional contract on 27 November 2007 at the age of 17. He made his Veikkausliiga debut six months later on 26 June 2008 against IFK Mariehamn. During his first season with the Turku-based club, he made only eight appearances, but helped his team to win the Finnish championship. He scored his first senior goal for Inter on 3 May 2009 against MYPA. After representing Inter for five seasons, his contract was not renewed after the 2012 season and he signed with FC Lahti for one season.

Six months after signing with Lahti, it was announced that Kauko had signed a two-year contract with an option to a third, with German 2. Bundesliga side FSV Frankfurt. Upon expiry of his contract with FSV Frankfurt Kauko signed a two-year contract with German 3. Liga side FC Energie Cottbus.

In July 2016, Kauko signed a two-year contract with Danish club Randers FC. Two years later, on 28 June 2018, Kauko signed a contract with Esbjerg fB ahead of the 2018–19 Danish Superliga season.

Mohun Bagan AC
On 24 June 2021, shortly after Finland's elimination from the Euro 2020, Kauko joined Indian Super League club ATK Mohun Bagan on a two-year deal, making him the first ever major international footballer to play in India while still representing the national team. He was included in the twenty-two men squad by head coach Antonio Lopez Habas for the team's 2021 AFC Cup inter-zonal semifinal match against Uzbek side Nasaf, but they lost 6–0 and were eliminated from the tournament, in which he made his debut for the club.

On 19 November, Kauko made his Indian Super League debut against Kerala Blasters, in a 4–2 win. He scored his first goal for the club against NorthEast United, on 12 February, in a 3–1 win. He fired home from outside the box, which left goalkeeper Subhasish Chowdhury rooted to the spot. He ended the league season with three goals in twenty appearances, as Mohun Bagan AC finished third in the standings and were eliminated in the semi-final playoffs.

Kauko scored a brace each against Blue Star, on 12 April, and against Maziya S&RC on 24 May in AFC Cup Preliminary round and Group stage respectively. As 2022–23 season began, he appeared with the club on 20 August against Rajasthan United at the 131st edition of Durand Cup, but lost the match by 3–2.

International career

Kauko was a regular member for the Finland's U21 during 2009–2012, making in total of 23 appearances and scoring three goals. He has also served as a captain for the Finland U-21 team.

He made his senior debut on 22 January 2012, in a friendly against Trinidad and Tobago. During Finland's qualification campaign for the UEFA Euro 2016 he was a member of the team in 8 matches but remained as an unused substitute. In 2018–19 UEFA Nations League he gained four caps and was in the starting line up on 15 November 2018 in a match against Greece.

Kauko was called up for the UEFA Euro 2020 pre-tournament friendly match against Sweden on 29 May 2021.

Career statistics

Club

International

Honours and achievements

Club

Inter Turku
 Finnish League Cup: 2008
 Veikkausliiga: 2008
 Finnish Cup: 2009

FC Lahti
 Finnish League Cup: 2013

References

External links

 Randers FC official profile  
 Joni Kauko at FSV Frankfurt  
 
 
 
 
 
 

Living people
1990 births
Footballers from Turku
Association football midfielders
Finnish footballers
Finland youth international footballers
Finland under-21 international footballers
Finland international footballers
Turun Palloseura footballers
FC Inter Turku players
FC Lahti players
FSV Frankfurt players
FC Energie Cottbus players
Randers FC players
Esbjerg fB players
Veikkausliiga players
Kakkonen players
2. Bundesliga players
3. Liga players
Danish Superliga players
Danish 1st Division players
UEFA Euro 2020 players
Indian Super League players
ATK Mohun Bagan FC players
Finnish expatriate footballers
Finnish expatriate sportspeople in Germany
Expatriate footballers in Germany
Finnish expatriate sportspeople in Denmark
Expatriate men's footballers in Denmark
Expatriate footballers in India